Micropus, the cottonseeds, is a genus of flowering plants in the tribe Gnaphalieae within the family Asteraceae.

 Species
 Micropus amphibolus A.Gray - California
 Micropus californicus  Fisch. & C.A.Mey. - California, Oregon
 Micropus supinus L. - southern Europe, North Africa, Middle East, Central Asia

References

Gnaphalieae
Asteraceae genera